Monopylephorus is a genus of annelids belonging to the family Naididae.

The genus has cosmopolitan distribution.

Species:

Monopylephorus aucklandicus 
Monopylephorus camachoi 
Monopylephorus cuticulatus 
Monopylephorus evertus 
Monopylephorus irroratus 
Monopylephorus kermadecensis 
Monopylephorus limosus 
Monopylephorus moleti 
Monopylephorus parvus 
Monopylephorus rubroniveus

References

Annelids